Fine may refer to:

Characters
 Sylvia Fine (The Nanny), Fran's mother on The Nanny
 Officer Fine, a character in Tales from the Crypt, played by Vincent Spano

Legal terms
 Fine (penalty), money to be paid as punishment for an offence
 Fine on alienation, a sum of money paid to a feudal lord when a tenant had occasion to make over his land to another
 Fine of lands, an obsolete type of land conveyance to a new owner
 Fine, a dated term for a premium on a lease of land

Music
 Fine (band), a late 1990s American band
 Fine (album), a 1994 album by Snailhouse
 "Fine" (Taeyeon song), 2017
 "Fine" (Whitney Houston song), 2000
 "F.I.N.E.*", a 1993 song by Aerosmith
 "Fine", a song by James from the 2001 album Pleased to Meet You
 "Fine", a song by Kylie Minogue from the 2014 album Kiss Me Once
 "Fine", a song by Prism from the 1983 album Beat Street
 "fine", a 2019 song by Mike Shinoda

Brands and enterprises
 Fine (brandy), a term for some French brandy
 FINE (printing), a print head technology used in Canon printers
 Fine Air,  an international cargo airline that operated from 1989 to 2002
 Toyota Fine (Fuel cell INnovation Emotion), a series of concept cars

Metallurgy
 Fine, a term for the purity of precious metals; see Fineness
 Fine, to produce refined metal in a finery forge

Other uses 
 FINE, an informal association of the four main Fair Trade networks
 Fine (surname)
 Fine (mathematics), a property that partially orders the equivalence relations on a set
 Fine, New York, a town in the United States
 Fine flounder, a species of flounder
 Fine, an attribute of certain cricket fielding positions

See also
 Fine art(s)
 Fine topology (disambiguation), in mathematics
 Fines (disambiguation)
 Finest (disambiguation)
 
 Fein (disambiguation), including its variations and derivatives in surnames
 Fiennes (disambiguation)
 Fyne (disambiguation)
 Fynes, a given name and surname